The Stieng people are an ethnic group of Vietnam and Cambodia. They speak Stieng, a language in the Bahnaric group of the Mon–Khmer languages.

Most Stieng live in Bình Phước Province (81,708 in 2009) of the Southeast region of Vietnam. In Cambodia, they are grouped under the heading Khmer Loeu, referring to non-Khmer ethnic groups.

References 

Phùng Đăn Quang. 2005. Nhạc khí dân tộc S'Tiêng [Musical instruments of the S'Tiêng people]. Hanoi: Nhà xuất bản trẻ.

External links
Stieng language page from Ethnologue site

Ethnic groups in Vietnam
Ethnic groups in Cambodia